Heslar Naval Armory (formerly Indianapolis Naval Reserve Armory) was constructed in 1936 in Indianapolis, Indiana, United States, on the shore of White River as a Works Progress Administration construction project. It was designed by architect Ben H. Bacon and reflects an Art Moderne style. Heslar Naval Armory was the home of Naval Operations Support Center Indianapolis, Marine Corps Reserve Center Indianapolis, and Naval Recruiting Station Indianapolis, as well as the United States Naval Sea Cadet Corps Cruiser Indianapolis (CA-35) Division and the Central Indiana Young Marines of the Marine Corps League. In October 2008 the Indiana Wing Civil Air Patrol, state branch of the US Air Force Auxiliary, moved its headquarters functions and staff to the Armory.

The building and property are legally owned by the State of Indiana and managed by the Indiana State Armory Board (an entity of the Indiana National Guard), but were leased to the federal government for use by the United States Navy Reserve and the United States Marine Corps Reserve until early 2015. The facility was converted to educational use with the opening of Riverside High School. Renovating the armory for use as a school cost $10 million, and was completed in June 2018.

History
Construction began on the US$550,000 project in February 1936, and the building was officially dedicated as the Indianapolis Naval Reserve Armory at a ceremony on October 29, 1938. John K. Jennings, Indiana State WPA administrator, presented the building to Elmer F. Streub, adjutant-general, who then presented it to Captain O.F. Heslar, commandant of the Indiana State Naval Reserve. Louis J. Bornstein, representing the citizen's dedication committee, served as toastmaster. Guests included Lieutenant-Governor Henry F. Schricker; Indianapolis Mayor Walter C. Boetcher; Admiral Hayne Ellis, commander of the Ninth Naval District; and representatives of the Navy Department and the Navy Reserves of several states.

 
The structure was built of reinforced architectural concrete with steel roof trusses. Upon completion, the four-story building included a navigation bridge, signal hoist, magazine, battle telephones, boiler room, radio communication, watertight bulkheads, ship's ladders, galley,  swimming pool, gymnasium, rifle range, classrooms, and mess and quarters for officers and enlisted staff. The mess hall and gymnasium were decorated with  murals depicting famous naval battles and events.

Inscribed around the rotunda and on the walls of the exterior are the surnames of several significant figures in Naval History including George H. Preble, George Dewey, Oliver Hazard Perry, John Paul Jones, and David Glasgow Farragut.

Captain Heslar remained in this capacity through November 1940, when he was ordered to take his ship and her crew to Boston, Massachusetts, for refitting. It was here that the vessel was transferred to the active U.S. Navy and was docked at Pearl Harbor when that base was attacked by Japanese forces on December 7, 1941. She survived the attack while shooting down at least two enemy fighters, and participated in rescue and salvage operations immediately afterward.

During World War II, the inland location was ideal when generals and admirals, seeking to avoid the constant surveillance on the coasts, gathered regularly at the armory in Indianapolis to plan their Atlantic and Pacific campaigns, including elements of the pivotal Battle of Normandy that began June 6, 1944. Throughout World War II, the Indianapolis Naval Reserve Armory remained a vital facility where radioman and yeoman recruits trained for sea duty. Following that conflict it returned to a peacetime reserve function. In 1946, the United States Marine Corps reactivated Headquarters Co. 16th Infantry Battalion for training and ordered them to Heslar. This unit was called for duty in Korea in 1950.

On December 12, 1964, the Indianapolis Naval Armory was renamed the Heslar Naval Armory in honor of its first and longest-serving commanding officer in a dinner ceremony emceed by Harry T. Ice. Mrs. Heslar was ill and unable to attend, but a tape recording was played for her later in their home in New Augusta. In attendance were Heslar's son, Lieutenant Fred G. Heslar USNR, and his wife, as well as former Indiana Governor Ralph Gates; Rear Admiral Howard A. Yeager, Commandant of the Ninth Naval District, Great Lakes Illinois; Colonel George P. Hill Jr, Commanding Officer of Fort Harrison; Commander Joseph W. Tilford, commanding officer of the Indianapolis Naval Reserve; Brigadier General John D. Friday of the Indiana National Guard; Brigadier General G. Wray DePrez Indiana National Guard (ret.), president of the Indiana State Armory Board; Brigadier General Kenneth E. Keene, assistant chief, Indiana Air National Guard; Captain James C. Wootton, commanding officer of Naval Avionics Facility; Captain Firman F. Knachel; and Captain Robert O. Jackson, commander of Indiana Naval Forces.

Unveiled at the ceremony was a plaque that is now mounted on the exterior of the rotunda and reads:

Heslar Naval Armoryin honor ofCaptain Ola Fred Heslar, USNR (Ret.)Commanding Officer of the Naval Reserve State of Indiana 1921-1940

A dedicated Naval officer and true hoosier, Captain Heslar has given unselfishly of his time, knowledge, and efforts to further the Naval Reserve and the Indiana Naval Forces.

Held in the highest esteem by his fellow officers and fellow hoosiers, it is altogether fitting that this armory be dedicated and so named.

Matthew E. WelshGovernor, State of Indiana
1964

In 1978, after the nearby Marine Reserve facility in Riverside Municipal Park was damaged, a decision was made to renovate the Armory and accommodate local Marine Reserve Components. Renovation began in 1977 with the removal of nearly all non-support internal structure and replacing them with a more modern floorplan. Also, a large parking lot was created on the former site of the Riverside Amusement Park. On November 1, 1978, the facility was re-designated as a Navy and Marine Corps Reserve Center.

In early 2015 the Navy and the Marine Corps discontinued use of the facility.  Renovations to convert the armory into Riverside High School were completed in June 2018.

Heslar Naval Armory has been listed as a contributing property to the Indianapolis Park and Boulevard System, along with several other sites and buildings. The buildings together form a Historic district that has been listed on the National Register of Historic Places since 2003.

Captain Ola F. Heslar (1891–1970)

Ola Fred Heslar was born October 5, 1891, in Brazil, Indiana, to Walter and Minnie (née Rhodes) Heslar. He attended grade school in Brazil and Crawfordsville, and high school in Indianapolis. He enlisted in the U.S. Navy in 1907 and, after basic training, was assigned to a submarine in the Philippine Islands. Later, he was stationed at Norfolk Navy Yard as a radioman.

In April 1913, Heslar married Alice Marie Young of Rockland, Maine. He earned a commission in 1916 and served aboard  in the Mediterranean Sea and Atlantic Ocean. Next, and no doubt in reflection of his experience as a radioman, Heslar was assigned as Officer-in-Charge of the Transatlantic Radio Station in Tuckerton, New Jersey.

From 1919 until 1920, Heslar served as a staff officer under Admiral Henry Braid Wilson, Commander in Chief, U.S. Atlantic Fleet (CINCLANT), 1919–1921. He continued that duty under Admiral Hilary P. Jones when Admiral Jones accepted the post of Commander in Chief of the U.S. Atlantic Fleet in 1922.

In 1922, Capt. Heslar retired from active Navy service and entered the U.S. Navy Reserve. He was assigned to active duty as Area Commander of Indiana, and later Chief of Naval Affairs for the State of Indiana. It was in these posts that he founded and organized the Indiana Naval Forces by initiating the Indiana Naval Militia Act, which was passed into law on March 1, 1927. Also in this capacity, Capt. Heslar oversaw the construction of the Naval Armories at Indianapolis and Michigan City. Capt. Heslar set a standard that was to be followed nationwide by naval reserve training and operational facilities when he established the first naval training activities at Heslar Naval Armory. During this time, Captain Heslar was also a member of the Great Lakes Commission of Indiana, and the Indiana Board of Public Harbors.

Heslar's first wife died in August 1930, having borne no children. In 1934, Heslar remarried to Mabel Kathleen Gasaway of Indianapolis. In July 1938, Fred Gasaway Heslar, Capt. Heslar's only child, was born.

With the beginning of World War II Capt. Heslar returned to staff and combat duties serving as Director of Training, 9th Naval District, Great Lakes, Illinois and, later, on the staff of Admiral William Halsey. On May 17, 1943 Capt. Heslar was awarded an honorary doctorate of law from DePauw University. He then went on to perform postgraduate work at the Massachusetts Institute of Technology and Columbia University.

In 1944, it was announced that Captain Heslar would be promoted to rear admiral. However, due to his health, he was sent to the Mayo Clinic and forced to permanently retire from Naval Service. In 1959, he was awarded the Navy Distinguished Service Medal for exceptionally meritorious and distinguished service.

Upon returning home to Indianapolis, newly elected Republican Governor Ralph M. Gates appointed Captain Heslar to the position of Indiana State Purchasing Director, which the Captain assumed on February 1, 1945. As of January 12, 1946, he was a member of the Republican Party, the Blue Lodge Free and Accepted Masons, the Columbia Club, the Woodstock Club, and the Methodist Church.

Commanding officers

Artifacts

Heslar Naval Armory is home to several artifacts of Naval history including:

 a bell from  cast in 1942 with the commissioning of that ship.
 a bell from  cast in 1932 with the commissioning of that ship.
 a damaged flag recovered from USS Indianapolis presented to the city of Indianapolis on February 2, 1960 by the Indianapolis Council of the Navy League of the United States.
 a memorial to  established by the Submarine Veterans of W.W.II, Hoosier Squadron. This memorial has since been removed and moved to a location unknown.
 a quartermaster's logbook from USS Indiana in 1943.
 original blueprints for USS Indiana.

NOSC Indianapolis logo

The logo for NOSC Indianapolis (then NMCRC Indianapolis) was created by QM1 Jerome (Jerry) Bennett and approved by CDR Lee Shafer in 1980. The eagle represents the US, the Hoosier homeland is represented by the state's outline. The unique nature of the WPA constructed building represents the peacetime home of the reservist. The ship's wheel is for guidance, and the anchor for stability – both values central to Navy Reserve Training.

References

External links

United States Navy Reserve website
Indiana Wing Civil Air Patrol
Historic Landmarks Foundation of Indiana- Landmark of the Month 2006 Archive
Google Books- The Encyclopedia of Indianapolis- Heslar Naval Armory listing
Google Earth display for Heslar Naval Armory
A history project about the building (currently under construction)

United States Navy installations
United States Navy Reserve
Armories in Indiana
Military installations in Indiana
IUPUI Jaguars men's basketball
Works Progress Administration in Indiana
Historic district contributing properties in Indiana
National Register of Historic Places in Indianapolis
1936 establishments in Indiana